Lago di Montedoglio is an artificial lake in the Province of Arezzo, Tuscany, Italy. At an elevation of 435 m, its surface area is 7.7 km².

Lakes of Tuscany